Paul Brochart (22 April 1899 – 22 December 1971) was a Belgian sprinter. He competed at the 1920, 1924 and 1928 Summer Olympics.

References

External links
 

1899 births
1971 deaths
Athletes (track and field) at the 1920 Summer Olympics
Athletes (track and field) at the 1924 Summer Olympics
Athletes (track and field) at the 1928 Summer Olympics
Belgian male sprinters
Olympic athletes of Belgium